Artificial Paradise may refer to:

 Artificial Paradise (The Guess Who album), 1973 
 Artificial Paradise (Sylvan album)
 Artificial Paradise (film), a 1990 Yugoslavian film